Several ships of the Chilean Navy have been named O'Higgins after Bernardo O'Higgins Chilean independence leader

 
 
  was an armored cruiser that served from 1898 until 1933.
  was the former USS Brooklyn sold by the United States to Chile in 1951, and served until 1992.
 

O'Higgins, Chilean ship